Freeston is a surname. Notable people with the surname include:

Sir Brian Freeston (1892–1958), British colonial official
Jesse Freeston, Canadian video journalist and filmmaker
John Freeston (1512–1594), English barrister, founder of the Normanton Grammar School
Nicholas Freeston (1907–1978), English poet

See also
Freeston Academy, a state-run, coeducational high school situated in Normanton, West Yorkshire
Freestone (disambiguation)
Freston (disambiguation)